Agustín Javier Gómez (born 5 February 1983) is a retired Argentine professional footballer who played as a goalkeeper.

Career
Gómez started his senior career with Nueva Chicago in 2003, which would turn out to be the first of three separate spells with the club. He departed the then-Argentine Primera División team in 2004 to join Villa Dálmine of Primera C Metropolitana, prior to returning a year after. Gómez's secondary spell lasted two years, by which point he had appeared twice in the top-flight for Nueva Chicago. 2007 saw Gómez join Quilmes, but he failed to feature during the 2007–08 Primera B Nacional and subsequently left to sign for Atlanta in 2008. Six appearances followed for the club in Primera B Metropolitana.

On 30 June 2009, Nueva Chicago resigned Gómez for a second time; with them now playing in the same division as Atlanta. He would go on to be selected in eighty-one matches across the 2009–10 and 2010–11 campaigns. Midway through the 2011–12 season, Gómez completed a return to Primera C Metropolitana's Villa Dálmine. The club were promoted to Primera B Metropolitana in his first season as champions. He departed the team two and a half years and sixty-eight games later. Subsequent spells with Deportivo Morón and Almagro preceded a reunion with Atlanta.

In August 2017, Gómez joined Barracas Central. He belatedly made his club debut on 25 January 2018, playing the full duration of a 2–0 victory over Talleres in Primera B Metropolitana. They finished the campaign sixth, reaching the play-offs where they were knocked out by Defensores de Belgrano. Deportivo Riestra agreed to sign Gómez on loan in June 2018.

Career statistics
.

Honours
Villa Dálmine
Primera C Metropolitana: 2011–12

References

External links

1983 births
Living people
People from Luján, Buenos Aires
Argentine footballers
Association football goalkeepers
Argentine Primera División players
Primera Nacional players
Primera C Metropolitana players
Primera B Metropolitana players
Nueva Chicago footballers
Villa Dálmine footballers
Quilmes Atlético Club footballers
Club Atlético Atlanta footballers
Deportivo Morón footballers
Club Almagro players
Barracas Central players
Deportivo Riestra players
Sportspeople from Buenos Aires Province